Geert Alle Bakker (15 January 1921 in Appingedam – 7 August 1993 in Warmond) was a sailor from the Netherlands, who represented his country at the 1976 Summer Olympics in Kingston, Ontario, Canada. With crew Pieter Keijzer and Harald de Vlaming Bakker took the 5th place in the Soling. Since in 1980 The  Netherlands did boycott the Moscow Olympic Games Bakker again in the Soling  represented his National Olympic Committee under the Dutch NOC flag. This time with crew Dick Coster and his son Steven Bakker They took again 5th place.

From 1976 till 1979 Geert was president of the International Soling Association. After a brain stroke in 1983 he stayed close involved with Soling Sailing however he specialized in judging.

Controversy
Several countries did boycott the 1980 Summer Olympics, others like France did not go since they found the competition devaluated. As result only half of the expected fleet was present during the Olympic regattas. It was the effort of Bakker and Ben Staartjes that the Dutch Olympic Sailing Team went to Tallinn.

Sources
 
 
 
 
 
 
 
 
 
 
 
 
 
 

1921 births
1993 deaths
People from Appingedam
Dutch male sailors (sport)
Sailors at the 1976 Summer Olympics – Soling
Sailors at the 1980 Summer Olympics – Soling
Olympic sailors of the Netherlands
20th-century Dutch people
Sportspeople from Groningen (province)